Chai ( "living" ) figures prominently in modern Jewish culture; the Hebrew letters of the word are often used as a visual symbol.

History
According to The Jewish Daily Forward, its use as an amulet originates in 18th century Eastern Europe. Chai as a symbol goes back to medieval Spain. Letters as symbols in Jewish culture go back to the earliest Jewish roots, the Talmud states that the world was created from Hebrew letters which form verses of the Torah. In medieval Kabbalah, Chai is the lowest (closest to the physical plane) emanation of God. According to 16th century Greek rabbi Shlomo Hacohen Soloniki, in his commentary on the Zohar, Chai as a symbol has its linkage in the Kabbalah texts to God's attribute of 'Ratzon', or motivation, will, muse.  The Jewish commentaries give an especially long treatment to certain verses in the Torah with the word as their central theme. Three examples are Leviticus 18:5  'Chai Bahem', 'and you shall live by [this faith]' (as opposed to just doing it), this is part of the section dealing with the legacy of Moses Our Teacher following his death. Deuteronomy 30:15  "Verily, I have set before thee this day life and good, and death and evil, in that I command thee this day to love the  thy God, to walk in His ways, and to keep His commandments and His statutes and His ordinances; then thou shalt live." There is nary an ancient Jewish commentator who does not comment on that verse. The Shema prayer as well speaks of the importance of Chai, to live and walk in the Jewish cultural lifestyle.

Two common Jewish names used since Talmudic times, are based on this symbol, Chaya feminine, Chayim masculine. The Jewish toast (on alcoholic beverages such as wine) is l'chaim, 'to life'.

On a spiritual (and historical) level, chai stands for being alive in front of God as opposed to being (spiritually) dead. This is derived from Tenach, Deuteronomy 30:19–20 where (the) heaven(s) and the earth are depicted as a witness for the fact that there is life and death, blessing and curse and that you (therefore) should choose Life (God), in order to live.

Linguistics
The word is made up of two letters of the Hebrew alphabet – Chet and Yod, forming the word "chai", meaning "alive", or "living". The most common spelling in Latin script is "Chai", but the word is occasionally also spelled "Hai".

In Hebrew, the related word chaya means "living thing" or "animal", and is derived from the Hebrew word chai, meaning "alive".

Numerology
There have been various mystical numerological speculations about the fact that, according to the system of gematria, the letters of chai add up to 18 (see "Lamedvavniks" etc.). For this reason, 18 is a spiritual number in Judaism, and many Jews give gifts of money in multiples of 18 as a result.

In Jewish culture

The Chai symbol can be worn by Jews as a medallion around the neck, similarly to other Jewish symbols, such as the Star of David and the Hamsa.

Jews often give gifts and donations in multiples of 18, which is called "giving chai". Mailings from Jewish charities usually suggest the amounts to give in multiples of chai (18, 36, 54 dollars, etc.) rather than the usual multiples of 25.

It appears in the slogan "!" ("The people of Israel live!").

It is heard in a BBC recording from April 20, 1945 of Jewish survivors of the Bergen-Belsen concentration camp five days after their liberation. This was the first Sabbath ceremony openly conducted on German soil since the beginning of the war. With people still dying around them, the survivors sang what would become the Israeli national anthem, "Hatikvah". At the end of "Hatikvah", British Army Chaplain Leslie Hardman shouts out, Am Yisrael Chai! ("The people of Israel is alive!")

In the Eurovision Song Contest 1983, which was held in Germany four decades after Shoah, Israel was represented with the song "Chai", performed by Ofra Haza, which includes the line Am Yisra'el chai.

Several Jewish radio stations have the word in their names, including Kol Chai (Israel), Radio Jai (Argentina), and ChaiFM (South Africa).

Chai jewelry

Elvis Presley wore a chai necklace while performing toward the end of his life. Baseball star Rod Carew wore a chai necklace during his playing days; his first wife and daughters were Jewish, even though Carew himself never formally converted to Judaism. Canadian rapper Drake, himself Jewish, wore a chai necklace on the cover of Vibe magazine in 2010.

See also
 Culture of Israel
 Hamsa
 Hayyi Rabbi
 Jewish ceremonial art

References

Symbols
Jewish symbols

he:חי